"Innocent" is the second single released from Fuel's 2000 second studio album Something Like Human. The inspiration for songs lyrical content is not known.

An official acoustic version with a piano melody surfaced online in 2015.

Appearances
A music video was filmed, directed by Nigel Dick.

The song was originally going to appear on the soundtrack of the 1998 feature film City Of Angels, but songwriter Carl Bell felt the song was better suited to only appear on the band's album.
The song was performed live on The Late Show with David Letterman.

Track listing
Song written by Carl Bell

Personnel
 Brett Scallions - lead vocals, rhythm guitar
 Carl Bell - lead guitar
 Jeff Abercrombie - bass 
 Kevin Miller - drums

Chart positions

References

2000 singles
Fuel (band) songs
Songs written by Carl Bell (musician)
Music videos directed by Nigel Dick
2000 songs
Epic Records singles